is a railway station in Arakawa, Tokyo, Japan, operated by East Japan Railway Company (JR East), Tokyo Metro, and the Metropolitan Intercity Railway Company. The stations for each of these lines are located in separate buildings, necessitating crossing a road to reach each station's ticket exchange.

Lines
Minami-Senju Station is served by the following lines.
 JR East:  Jōban Line
 Tokyo Metro:   (H-21)
  Metropolitan Intercity Railway Tsukuba Express (TX-04)

Station layout

JR East
One elevated island platform serving two tracks.

Tokyo Metro
Two elevated side platforms serving two tracks.

Metropolitan Intercity Railway
Two underground side platforms serving two tracks.

History
The Jōban Line station opened on 25 December 1896.

The Hibiya Line station opened on 28 March 1961. The station facilities of this line were inherited by Tokyo Metro after the privatization of the Teito Rapid Transit Authority (TRTA) in 2004.

The Tsukuba Express station opened on 24 August 2005.

Surrounding area
During the period between 1650 and 1873, the area was the location of the Kozukappara execution grounds. Between 100,000 and 200,000 people died here during the Tokugawa period. Near the south exit of the Tokyo Metro station, a small temple and burial ground commemorates this. Part of the burial grounds currently lie beneath the Hibiya Line tracks.

There are many cheap hotels in the area.

Other locations of note include:
 San'ya district
 National Route 4
 Sumidagawa Freight Terminal (JR Freight)

References

External links

 JR East Minami-Senju Station 
 Tokyo Metro Minami-Senju Station 
 TX Minami-Senju Station 

Railway stations in Japan opened in 1896
Railway stations in Tokyo
Jōban Line
Tokyo Metro Hibiya Line
Stations of Tsukuba Express
Stations of East Japan Railway Company
Stations of Tokyo Metro